The third conference of the 2022–23 PBA 3x3 season started on January 14 and ended on February 26, 2023. It consisted of six two-day legs and a grand final. TNT Tropang Giga defeated San Miguel Beermen in the Grand Finals, 21–18, to become the conference's Grand Champion and to complete the first ever PBA 3x3 Grand Slam.

Teams
The players listed have played in at least one of the legs.

1st leg

Groupings

Preliminary round

Pool A

Pool B

Pool C

Pool D

Classification 9th–12th

Knockout stage
San Miguel Beermen defeated Pioneer ElastoSeal Katibays in the finals, 21–17, to become the first leg winners.

Bracket

Quarterfinals

Semifinals

Third place game

Finals

Final standings

2nd leg

Groupings

Preliminary round

Pool A

Pool B

Pool C

Pool D

Classification 9th–12th

Knockout stage
TNT Tropang Giga defeated Barangay Ginebra San Miguel in the finals, 20–14, to become the second leg winners.

Bracket

Quarterfinals

Semifinals

Third place game

Finals

Final standings

3rd leg

Groupings

Preliminary round

Pool A

Pool B

Pool C

Pool D

Classification 9th–12th

Knockout stage
Barangay Ginebra San Miguel defeated Platinum Karaoke in the finals, 20–19, to become the third leg winners.

Bracket

Quarterfinals

Semifinals

Third place game

Finals

Final standings

4th leg

Groupings

Preliminary round

Pool A

Pool B

Pool C

Pool D

Classification 9th–12th

Knockout stage
Cavitex Braves defeated Pioneer ElastoSeal Katibays in the finals, 19–15, to become the fourth leg winners.

Bracket

Quarterfinals

Semifinals

Third place game

Finals

Final standings

5th leg

Groupings

Preliminary round

Pool A

Pool B

Pool C

Pool D

Classification 9th–12th

Knockout stage
Platinum Karaoke defeated Cavitex Braves in the finals, 17–15, to become the fifth leg winners.

Bracket

Quarterfinals

Semifinals

Third place game

Finals

Final standings

6th leg

Groupings

Preliminary round

Pool A

Pool B

Pool C

Pool D

Classification 9th–12th

Knockout stage

Bracket

Quarterfinals

Semifinals

Third place game

Finals

Final standings

Legs summary

Grand Finals

Preliminary round

Pool A

Pool B

Knockout stage

Bracket
Seed refers to the position of the team after six legs. Letter and number inside parentheses denotes the pool letter and pool position of the team, respectively, after the preliminary round of the Grand Finals.

Quarterfinals

Semifinals

Third place game

Finals

References

3x3 3rd
Pba 3rd conference
2023 in 3x3 basketball